Wisk was an American brand of laundry detergent manufactured in the United States by Unilever (1956 to 2008) and Sun Products (2008 to 2017).

History
Wisk was introduced in the United States by Lever Brothers Company in 1956 as the first liquid laundry detergent.  

In 2008, Wisk was purchased by Vestar Capital Partners after Lever Brothers' parent company Unilever divested its North American laundry brands and combined with Vestar Capital Partners' Huish Detergents, Inc. to form The Sun Products Corporation. 

In 2010, Wisk was re-launched with a new formulation with new packaging, featuring its new Stain Spectrum Technology and its ability to fight tough stains. A new advertising campaign was also launched, that features the "science of stain fighting". The brand came in a variety of formulations, including "Deep Clean", "High Efficiency", "Fresh Boost" and "Oxi Complete".

In June 2016, Henkel acquired Sun Products and discontinued the brand in favor of its own Persil brand.

Marketing
The brand was widely known for its successful "Ring Around The Collar" campaign introduced in 1968, spotlighting sometimes-difficult to treat stains that appeared on shirt collars, and the product's ability to help fight them. The campaign was created by BBDO. The nagging sing-song voiceover of "Ring around the collar!" was performed by Bob McFadden. The campaign was criticized decades later for being misogynistic, with the implication that it was the fault of wives that their husbands left home with dirty collars.

References

External links
Official website

Laundry detergents
Products introduced in 1956
Defunct consumer brands
Products and services discontinued in 2017